Lacimonas is a Gram-negative genus of bacteria from the family of Rhodobacteraceae with one known species (Lacimonas salitolerans). Lacimonas salitolerans has been isolated from the Lake Tuosu from Qinghai in China.

References

Rhodobacteraceae
Bacteria genera
Monotypic bacteria genera